Gülüstan or Gioulistan or Gyulyustan or Gyulistan may refer to:
 Gülüstan, Goranboy, Azerbaijan
 Gülüstan, Nakhchivan, Azerbaijan
 Nor Aznaberd, Armenia